Veliki Popovac is a village situated in Petrovac na Mlavi municipality in Serbia.

References

Populated places in Braničevo District